Gregers is a given name. Notable people with the given name include:

Gregers Algreen-Ussing (born 1938), Danish architect and academic
Gregers Arndal-Lauritzen (born 1998), Danish footballer
Gregers Birgersson (died 1276), Swedish knight and major landowner
Gregers Brinch (born 1964), Danish composer
Gregers Gram (1917–1944), Norwegian resistance fighter and saboteur
Gregers Lundh (1786–1836), Norwegian military officer and academic
Gregers Münter (1907–1988), Danish officer and sports shooter
Gregers Winther Wulfsberg (1780–1846), Norwegian jurist and politician

See also
Greger (given name), another given name
Greger, surname

Danish masculine given names
Norwegian masculine given names